Trịnh Văn Lợi (born 26 May 1995) is a Vietnamese  footballer who plays as a defender for V.League 1 side Thanh Hóa.

Career statistics

Club

Notes

Honours

Club
Đông Á Thanh Hóa
Vietnamese National Cup:
 Third place : 2022

References

1995 births
Living people
Vietnamese footballers
V.League 1 players
Association football defenders
Thanh Hóa FC players
Haiphong FC players